Živilė Rezgytė (born September 9, 1978) is a Lithuanian-American business executive and former rhythmic gymnast. During her professional rhythmic gymnastics career in the late 1990s, Rezgytė competed at the 1996 Rhythmic Gymnastics European Championships, the 1997 World Rhythmic Gymnastics Championships, and the Rhythmic Gymnastics Grand Prix. After immigrating to the United States in the early 2000s, she began working in the real estate industry as a business executive. She married Andrew Giuliani, son of former New York City Mayor Rudy Giuliani, in 2017.

Biography 
Rezgytė was born and raised in Klaipėda, Lithuania. She trained as a rhythmic gymnast and, in 1996, competed in the 1996 Rhythmic Gymnastics European Championships in both the individual and team categories. The next year, she competed in the 1997 World Rhythmic Gymnastics Championships in Berlin, representing Lithuania in the individual category. She also competed in the Rhythmic Gymnastics Grand Prix.

She immigrated to the United States, taking up residency in New York City, in the early 2000s. She later became an American citizen.

On September 25, 2014, Rezgytė met Andrew Giuliani while attending a New York Yankees game at Yankee Stadium. They were married on July 14, 2017 in a Catholic ceremony celebrated by Monsignor Alan Placa at the Church of St. Joseph in Greenwich Village.

References 

Living people
21st-century American businesswomen
21st-century American businesspeople
21st-century Lithuanian businesspeople
American real estate businesspeople
Lithuanian women in business
Živilė
Lithuanian business executives
Lithuanian emigrants to the United States
Lithuanian rhythmic gymnasts
Lithuanian Roman Catholics
People from Klaipėda
American women business executives
1978 births